Zdzisław Siuda was a Polish luger who competed in the early 1960s. He won a bronze medal in the men's singles event at the 1962 FIL European Luge Championships in Weissenbach, Austria.

References
  

Polish male lugers
Possibly living people
Year of birth missing
Place of birth missing (living people)